The California Cup Matron was an American thoroughbred horse race run annually at Santa Anita Park in Arcadia, California during its Oak Tree Racing Association meet in the fall of the year. Raced on dirt over a distance of 1 1/16 miles, it open is open to fillies and mares bred in the state of California. The event currently offers a purse of $150,000 and a trophy.

The California Cup Matron was a part of the "California Cup Day" series of races intended to call attention to, and to honor, the California Thoroughbred racing and breeding industry

Past winners
 2009 - Lady Railrider (Frank Alvarado)
 2008 - Famous Ruby (Joel Rosario)
 2007 - Romance Is Diane (Michael C. Baze)
 2006 - Somethinaboutlaura 
 2005 - Dream of Summer
 2004 - Dream of Summer
 2003 - Royally Chosen
 2002 - Super High
 2001 - Cee Dreams
 2000 - Queenie Belle
 1999 - Feverish
 1998 - Belle's Flag
 1997 - Fun in Excess
 1996 - Belle's Flag
 1995 - Yearly Tour
 1994 - Glass Ceiling
 1993 - Sensational Eyes
 1992 - Lovely Habit
 1991 - Teresa MC

References
 Oak Tree racing meet at Santa Anita
 The California Cup Matron at Pedigree Query.com

Horse races in California
Recurring sporting events established in 1991
Recurring events disestablished in 2010
1991 establishments in California
2010 disestablishments in California
Graded stakes races in the United States
Racing series for horses